The 1916 Swarthmore Quakers football team was an American football team that represented Swarthmore College as an independent during the 1916 college football season. The team compiled a 6–1–1 record and outscored opponents by a total of 94 to 45. Bill Roper was the head coach.

A new football field was donated during the 1916 season. The field was built with a contribution from Morris L. Clothier, a Swarthmore alumnus and Philadelphia merchant, and was named Swarthmore Field.

Schedule

References

Swarthmore
Swarthmore Garnet Tide football seasons
Swarthmore Quakers football